Roseline Vachetta (born 12 December 1951 in Le Mans) is a French Trotskyist politician.

She became a member of the Revolutionary Communist League (LCR) and in 1999 was elected to the European Parliament.  She lost her seat in 2004, but remained one of the LCR's three spokespersons until the party was dissolved in February 2009.

References

1951 births
Living people
People from Le Mans
Revolutionary Communist League (France) MEPs
New Anticapitalist Party politicians
MEPs for France 1999–2004
20th-century women MEPs for France
21st-century women MEPs for France
Workers' Struggle MEPs